Myelin P2 protein is a protein that in humans is encoded by the PMP2 gene.
Myelin protein P2 is a constituent of peripheral nervous system (PNS) myelin, also present in small amounts in central nervous system (CNS) myelin. As a structural protein, P2 is thought to stabilize the myelin membranes, and may play a role in lipid transport in Schwann cells. Structurally, P2 belongs to the family of cytoplasmic
fatty acid-binding proteins (FABPs).

References

Further reading

Lipocalins